The 2002-03 Thai Premier League had 10 teams. Two clubs would be relegated and 2 teams promoted from Thailand Division 1 League. The team that finished in 8th position would play in a relegation play-off. The official name of the league at this time was GSM Thai League.

Krung Thai Bank won their first ever Thai Premier League title and their 5th major title at the time.

Member clubs

Bangkok Bank
Bangkok Christian College (promoted from Division 1)
BEC Tero Sasana
Sinthana
Krung Thai Bank
Osotsapa M-150
Port Authority of Thailand
Royal Thai Air Force
Thailand Tobacco Monopoly
TOT

Final league table

Queen's Cup

Osotsapa won and retained the 30th edition of the Queen's Cup. They defeated TOT 1-0 in the final.

Asian Representation

  In a revamped Asian Champions League, BEC Tero Sasana would surprise the whole of Asia and bring back past glories not seen since Thai Farmers Bank in the mid 1990s and would reach the final of the Champions League where they would come runners up to UAE side Al Ain. On their way to the final BEC would claim victories over old Japanese rivals Kashima Antlers, Shanghai Shenhua of China, Daejeon Citizen of South Korea and Uzbekistan side Pakhtakor Tashkent.
 This was also the first time that two Thai clubs would enter the Champions League. Osotsapa would also take part but would find the going tough and would crash out in embarrassing circumstances in the group stage.
 BEC Tero Sasana would also take part in the newly formed 2003 ASEAN Club Championship to be held in Indonesia against the best of the rest of the ASEAN and SAFF region. Here they made the final but got beat by Indian side Kingfisher East Bengal

Annual awards

Coach of the Year

 Narong Suwannachote - Krung Thai Bank

Player of the year

 Khampee Pintapol - Bangkok Bank

Top scorer

 Sarayoot Chaikamdee 12 Goals - Port Authority of Thailand

Champions
The league champion was Krung Thai Bank.

References

Thailand 2002-03 RSSSF

External links
Official Website

Thai League
1
1
Thai League 1 seasons